Harley Orrin Staggers Sr. (August 3, 1907 – August 20, 1991) was an American politician who served 16 terms in the United States House of Representatives from 1949 to 1981, representing West Virginia's 2nd Congressional District as a Democrat. From 1966 until his retirement in 1981, Congressman Staggers chaired the powerful House Committee on Interstate and Foreign Commerce (today the Committee on Energy and Commerce). A longtime supporter of the American railroad industry and its workers, Congressman Staggers' landmark legislative achievement was the Staggers Rail Act, passed in 1980.

Career
Staggers was born on August 3, 1907, in Keyser, Mineral County, West Virginia; he graduated from Emory and Henry College in 1931 and did graduate work at Duke University.

Staggers served as sheriff of Mineral County from 1937 to 1941. He served as a navigator in the U.S. Naval Air Corps during World War II. In 1948, Staggers was elected to the U.S. House of Representatives, representing West Virginia's 2nd Congressional District. He was reelected to another 15 terms in the congress, serving until his retirement in 1981. For 16 years, from 1966 until his retirement, Staggers chaired the powerful House Committee on Foreign and Interstate Commerce (Energy and Commerce), the longest uninterrupted tenure of any chairman of that committee in its over 200-year history (Staggers' successor, John Dingell, served for 14 years from 1981 until 1995 and again from 2007 until 2009). He was a delegate to the Democratic National Convention from West Virginia in 1960. Staggers did not sign the 1956 Southern Manifesto, and voted in favor of the Civil Rights Acts of 1957, 1960, 1964, and 1968, as well as the 24th Amendment to the U.S. Constitution and the Voting Rights Act of 1965. He died in Cumberland, Maryland on August 20, 1991.

First Amendment
On June 10, 1971, the U.S. Supreme Court ruled that the Nixon Administration could not block The New York Times from publishing the Pentagon Papers. The next month, on July 12, 1971, Staggers ordered CBS News to hand over film not used in the documentary, Selling of the Pentagon.

According to Staggers this was the only way to know if the documentary had been accurately edited. The president of CBS News, Frank Stanton, said he would go to jail before complying with Staggers' subpoenas. The House supported Stanton and Staggers was forced to abandon his ultimatum.

In 1973, Staggers heard on the radio the John Lennon song "Working Class Hero" — which includes the lines "'Til you're so fucking crazy you can't follow their rules" and "But you're still fucking peasants as far as I can see" — on WGTB and lodged a complaint with the Federal Communications Commission (FCC). The manager of the station, Ken Sleeman, faced a year in prison and a $10,000 fine, but defended his decision to play the song saying, "The People of Washington, DC are sophisticated enough to accept the occasional four-letter word in context, and not become sexually aroused, offended, or upset." The charges were dropped.

Illegal drugs in sports
On May 11, 1973, the House Committee on Interstate and Foreign Commerce which was chaired by Staggers issued a press release summarizing the results of an investigation that determined illegal drug use existed in all level of sports. The investigation also described the degree of use, including steroids and amphetamines, as alarming.

Legacy

In 1980, Congress passed legislation crafted by Congressman Staggers and other members of the Interstate and Foreign Commerce Committee to carry out the deregulation of America's railroad industry. The Staggers Rail Act was signed into law by President Jimmy Carter on October 14, 1980, and named in honor of Congressman Staggers in recognition of his many years of work on the part of railroad companies and their workers. By eliminating archaic regulations over the railroad industry, the bill allowed rail companies to enter into contracts with shippers and set their own prices without Interstate Commerce Commission approval. The Staggers Rail Act is viewed as having a significant role in strengthening the American railroad industry as well as improving safety.

A Federal Court and Post Office building in Morgantown, West Virginia as well as a portion of Water Street in his hometown of Keyser, West Virginia, are named in honor of Congressman Staggers.

Children
Staggers's daughter Mary Kaye Staggers was a professor at Potomac State College and is a member of the West Virginia Democratic Executive Committee. His sons, Harley O. Staggers Jr. and Daniel C. Staggers, practice law in Keyser, West Virginia. Harley Jr. was also a member of the United States House of Representatives, representing West Virginia's 2nd congressional district from 1983 to 1993. His daughter Margaret Anne "Peggy" Staggers, a resident of Fayetteville, West Virginia, has been a member of the West Virginia House of Delegates since 2006. Daughter Susan owned and managed two successful local businesses in Keyser until her and her husband's retirement. His daughter Ellen resides in Morgantown.

See also

List of United States representatives from West Virginia
Staggers Rail Act

References

External links
 Retrieved on 2009-05-20
 Harley O. Staggers Sr. Congressional Papers
 

1907 births
1991 deaths
Methodists from West Virginia
United States Navy officers
Duke University alumni
Educators from West Virginia
Emory and Henry College alumni
Military personnel from West Virginia
People from Keyser, West Virginia
Staggers family of West Virginia
United States Navy personnel of World War II
West Virginia sheriffs
Democratic Party members of the United States House of Representatives from West Virginia
20th-century American politicians